A bicycle clip hat is a style of small hat or millinery decoration that includes a metal clip – similar to traditional designs used by cyclists – to hold it in place. It may be very similar to a half hat or fascinator in design, covering only part of the head.

The term has also been used to describe a design of headband that became popular in the 1950s and 1960s. This might be fabric attached to a piece of curved metal that held it firmly on the head.

In the 1950s, the bicycle clip design was also incorporated into designs of chignon cap – a fabric covering designed to cover a bun at the back of the head.

See also
Baseball cap
Cap of maintenance
Dutch cap
Gandhi cap
Halo hat

References

Hats
1950s fashion